The 2014 Rhythmic Gymnastics World Championships, the 33rd edition, was held in İzmir, Turkey, from September 21 to 28, 2014 at the İzmir Halkapınar Sport Hall.

Yana Kudryavtseva of the Russian Federation became the youngest rhythmic gymnast to win back-to-back individual all-around titles in the World Championships at 16 years old. She was also awarded the Longines Prize for elegance, which saw her receive $5,000, a statue by Swiss artist Jean-Pierre Gerber, and a watch. The Bulgarian group won the group all-around, 18 years later since the Bulgarian group won gold in group at the 1996 World Championships held in Budapest, Hungary.

Participating countries
List of delegations participating in Championship.

Schedule

Sat Sep 20 Saturday
09:00-19:00 	Training and Podium training for Individuals as per schedule
Sun Sep 21 Sunday
09:00-19:00    Training and Podium training for Individuals
19:00-21:00 	Opening Ceremony
Sep 22 Monday	
10:00-11:30   CI Individual group A - Hoop and Ball alternatively
12:00-13:35   CI Individual group B - Hoop and Ball alternatively
15:00-16:40   CI Individual group C - Hoop and Ball alternatively
17:10-18:45   CI Individual group D - Hoop and Ball alternatively
Sep 23 Tuesday	
10:00-11:40 CI Individual group C - Hoop and Ball alternatively
12:10-13:45 CI Individual group D - Hoop and Ball alternatively
15:15-16:45 CI Individual, group A - Hoop and Ball alternatively
17:15-18:55 CI Individual, group B - Hoop and Ball alternatively
20:00-20:30 CIII Individual Hoop
20:30-21:00 CIII Individual Ball
Award Ceremony Individual Final Hoop
Award Ceremony Individual Final Ball
Sep 24 Wednesday	
10:00-11:10  CI Individual group D - Clubs and Ribbon alternatively
11:10-12:20  CI Individual group C - Clubs and Ribbon alternatively
14:00-15:10  CI Individual group B - Clubs and Ribbon alternatively
15:10-16:15  CI Individual group A - Clubs and Ribbon alternatively
Sep 25 Thursday	
10:00-11:10  CI Individual group B - Clubs and Ribbon alternatively
11:10-12:15  CI Individual group A - Clubs and Ribbon alternatively
14:00-15:10  CI Individual group D - Clubs and Ribbon alternatively
15:10-16:20  CI Individual group C - Clubs and Ribbon alternatively
20:00-20:30  CIII Individual Clubs
20:30-21:00  CIII Individual Ribbon
Award Ceremony Individual Final ClubsAward Ceremony Individual Final RibbonAward Ceremony Teams

Sep 26	Friday
16:30-19:00 CII Individuals (gymnasts ranked 13-24)
20:00-22:30 CII Individuals (gymnasts ranked 1-12)	
Longines Prize of Elegance
Award ceremony Individual All-Around Final
Sep 27 Saturday	
15:00-17:15 CI Groups - 10 Clubs and 3 Balls + 2 Ribbons alternatively
17:45-20:00 CI Groups - 10 Clubs and 3 Balls + 2 Ribbons alternatively	
Award Ceremony General Competition Groups
Sep 28 Sunday	
15:00-15:40 CIII Groups - 10 Clubs
15:40-16:20 CIII Groups - 3 Balls + 2 Ribbons	
Award Ceremony Group Final 10 Clubs
Award Ceremony Group Final 3 Balls + 2 Ribbons

Medal winners

* reserve gymnast

Individual

Teams Competition and Individual Qualification

Team competition is only for countries with at least 3 participating/entries of gymnasts.
Only gymnasts competing in at least 3 apparatus can compete for the all-around qualifications; with the top three highest scores counted. The top 24 in qualifications advance to the all-around finals.

Hoop

Ball

Clubs

Ribbon

All-Around

Groups

Group compositions
  Margarida Cabral
  Nkumba Francisco
  Yolanda Gaspar
  Jandira Henriques
  Beniude Panguleipo
  Anastasiya Detkova
  Vanessa Nachbaur
  Anna Ruprecht
  Anna Sprinzl
  Lena Vertacnik
  Sabina Abbasova
  Diana Doman
  Aynur Mustafayeva
  Aliya Pashayeva
  Aliaksandra Platonova
  Siyana Vasileva
  Ksenya Cheldishkina
  Hanna Dudzenkova
  Maria Kadobina
  Maryia Katsiak
  Valeriya Pischelina
  Arina Tsitsilina
  Beatriz Francisco
  Mayra de Fatima Gmach
  Francielly Machado Pereira
  Isadora Magalhaes Silva
  Gabrielle Moraes da Silva
  Eliane Rosa Sampaio
  Reneta Kamberova
  Mihaela Maevska-Velichkova
  Tsvetelina Naydenova
  Tsvetelina Stoyanova
  Hristiana Todorova
  Katrina Cameron
  Maya Kojevnikov
  Teija Korjus
  Lucinda Nowell
  Anjelika Reznik
  Victoria Reznik
  Bao Yuqing
  Ding Ziyi
  Shu Siyao
  Yang Ye
  Zhang Ling
  Zhao Jingnan
  Katerina Gerychova
  Veronika Hegrova
  Alice Hejcova
  Tereza Lohynska
  Lenka Siroka
  Katerina Vernerova
  Yara Ahmed Baraka
  Jacinthe Tarek Eldeeb
  Alia Yassin Elkatib
  Sarah Elkattan
  Aisha Elkolali
  Malak Amr Mostafa
  Sandra Aguilar
  Artemi Gavezou Castro
  Elena Lopez
  Lourdes Mohedano
  Alejandra Quereda Flores
  Riikka Kangas
  Sonja Kokkonen
  Heleri Kolkkanen
  Elina Koprinen
  Kristina Lapina
  Aino Purje
  Samantha Ay
  Noemie Balthazard
  Elena Chabert
  Oceane Charoy
  Marine Letul
  Lea Peinoit
  Judith Hauser
  Anastasija Khmelnytska
  Daniela Potapova
  Dara Sajfutdinova
  Julia Stavickaja
  Rana Tokmak
  Eleni Doika
  Anastasia Giouvanaki
  Zoi Kontogianni
  Stefania Mitsana
  Stavroula Samara
  Lamprini Vlachogianni
  Blanka Boldizsar
  Csinszka Horvath
  Reka Lakatos
  Laura Ludanyi
  Emma Sipos
  Vivien Wehovszky
  Yuval Filo
  Alona Koshevatskiy
  Ekaterina Levina
  Karina Lykhvar
  Ida Mayrin
  Arianna Facchinetti
  Sofia Lodi
  Alessia Maurelli
  Marta Pagnini
  Camilla Patriarca
  Andreea Stefanescu
  Airi Hatakeyama
  Mao Kunii
  Rie Matsubara
  Sakura Noshitani
  Sayuri Sugimoto
  Kiko Yokota
  Yeon Jung Kim
  Jiwoo Lee
  Kyung Eun Lee
  Na Young Lee
  Hyun Jin Yang
  Inese Jastrebova
  Kitija Kausa
  Eliza Osmucniece
  Jevgenija Sepele
  Katrine Silina
  Paula Zaunere
  Diana Casillas
  Nelly Gonzalez Llanos
  Erandeni Nava
  Maria Eugenia Nava del Rio
  Marialicia Ortega Elizondo
  Alondra Rodriguez
  Dagmara Bak
  Zuzanna Klajman
  Aleksandra Kubiak
  Julia Namaczynska
  Natalia Sobolewska
  Lilianna Walczak
  Maria Costa
  Ana Rita Farinha Barata
  Anzhelika Faydevych
  Beatriz M. S. Goncalves Tojal
  Mafalda Matos
  Ines Pedro Ventura
  Daria Avtonomova
  Diana Borisova
  Anastasiia Maksimova
  Aleksandra Semenova
  Anastasiia Tatareva
  Maria Tolkacheva
  Stephanie Kaelin
  Julia Eva Novak
  Lisa Rusconi
  Tamara Stanisic
  Anne Tardent
  Nicole Turuani
  Phasika Chetsadalak
  Spanna Piyasangcharoen
  Patarathida Ratanasatien
  Iriya Rungrueang
  Waleeporn Taengmanee
  Ezgi Bozdemir
  Gulce Cagdas
  Eda Coskun
  Ece Mumcuoglu
  Burcin Neziroglu
  Asya Nur Tas
  Oleksandra Aslanyan
  Olena Dmytrash
  Oleksandra Gridasova
  Valeriia Gudym
  Olha Mykhalchuk
  Anastasiya Voznyak
  Kiana Eide
  Alisa Kano
  Natalie Mc Giffert
  Jennifer Rokhman
  Monica Rokhman
  Kristen Shaldybin
  Samira Amirova
  Luiza Ganieva
  Olga Kiryakova
  Zarina Kurbonova
  Evgeniya Larionova
  Marta Rostoburova

All-Around

10 Clubs

3 Balls + 2 Ribbons

Medal table

References

External links
 
 Rhythmic Gymnastics Results

World Rhythmic Gymnastics Championships
Rhythmic Gymnastics
Rhythmic Gymnastics World Championships
Sports competitions in Izmir
2010s in İzmir